Ribes leptanthum is a spiny-stemmed, small-leaved species of gooseberry in the genus Ribes commonly called trumpet gooseberry.  It is native to Arizona, Colorado, New Mexico, Texas, and Utah, where it is usually found in high-altitude canyons.

Ethnobotany
Historically the berries of R. leptanthum have been consumed in Native American cultures in a variety of ways: they are readily eaten fresh by Apache peoples, including the Chiricahua, Mescalero, and other peoples (specifically those in the vicinity of Isleta and Jemez in New Mexico); used as an ingredient in cakes made for overwintering by Chiricahua, and Mescalero peoples; and, in those communities where early-settling Spanish and Native American cultures have generally mingled or influenced each other, R. leptanthum  berries are used in recipes for jellies and wines.

References

leptanthum
Apache culture
Plants described in 1849
Flora of the Southwestern United States
Berries
North American desert flora
Drought-tolerant plants
Plants used in Native American cuisine